Kiprino is a rural locality (a selo) and the administrative center of Kiprinsky Selsoviet, Shelabolikhinsky District, Altai Krai, Russia. The population was 1,192 as of 2013. There are 17 streets.

Geography 
Kiprino is located 44 km northwest of Shelabolikha (the district's administrative centre) by road. Seleznyovo is the nearest rural locality.

References 

Rural localities in Shelabolikhinsky District